Sevil Shhaideh (née Geambec; born 4 December 1964) is a Romanian economist, civil servant and politician. On 21 December 2016, she was proposed by the Social Democrats to be  Prime minister of Romania, but was rejected by the president, Klaus Iohannis.

Studies and career 
Shhaideh was born on 4 December 1964, in Constanța, Romania. Her mother Muezel Cambek (née Karpat) is of Crimean Tatar origin and her father Saedin Cambek is of Turkish origin. In 1987 she graduated from the Academy of Economic Sciences of Bucharest, Faculty of Economic Planning and Cybernetics. She then worked in the public administration of Constanța County, becoming head of the Directorate General for Projects. In the same period, she was the coordinator of the National Union of Romanian county councils.
Since 2012 she worked as secretary of state in the Ministry of Regional Development.

Between May and November 2015 Shhaideh was minister of regional development and public administration in the Social Democratic government headed by Victor Ponta, succeeding Liviu Dragnea.

On 21 December 2016 she was indicated by the PSD and ALDE parties as candidate for prime minister to the President of Romania Klaus Iohannis. Dragnea, the PSD leader, indicated that he would keep the overall political responsibility over a Shhaideh government. If she had been approved, she would have been the first woman and first Muslim to hold that position. On 27 December, Iohannis, who comes from the National Liberal Party defeated by the governing coalition, rejected the nomination, prompting Dragnea and Călin Popescu-Tăriceanu, the leader of junior coalition partner Alliance of Liberals and Democrats to accuse Iohannis of playing partisan politics and to consider his removal from the presidency.

Personal life
Shhaideh's family are of the Sunni Muslim faith and belonged to the long established Turkish and Tatar ethnic minorities of Romania. Her mother is the niece of the Turkish historian Kemal Karpat.

She is married to the Syrian businessman Akram Shhaideh; the Romanian politician Liviu Dragnea was a witness at their wedding ceremony in 2011. According to a declaration of financial interests from July 2015, the couple own three properties in Syria, one in Latakia and two in Damascus.

References 

Romanian economists
1964 births
Social Democratic Party (Romania) politicians
Living people
Romanian people of Turkish descent
Romanian people of Crimean Tatar descent
Women members of the Romanian Cabinet
Romanian Ministers of Regional Development
Romanian Sunni Muslims
Deputy Prime Ministers of Romania
People from Constanța
Romanian Muslims
21st-century Romanian politicians
21st-century Romanian women politicians